The 1870 Rutgers Queensmen football team represented Rutgers University in the 1870 college football season. They finished with a 1–1 record.

Schedule

References

Rutgers
Rutgers Scarlet Knights football seasons
Rutgers Queensmen football